Eugenia Nosach (born ) is an Argentine volleyball player. She is part of the Argentina women's national volleyball team.

She participated in the 2014 FIVB Volleyball World Grand Prix.
On club level she played for Boca Juniors in 2014.

References

External links
 Profile at FIVB.org

1993 births
Living people
Argentine women's volleyball players
Place of birth missing (living people)
Wing spikers
Volleyball players at the 2020 Summer Olympics
Olympic volleyball players of Argentina
21st-century Argentine women